"Wagon Wheel" is a song co-written by Bob Dylan and Ketch Secor of Old Crow Medicine Show. Dylan recorded the chorus in 1973; Secor added verses 25 years later. Old Crow Medicine Show's final version was certified Platinum by the Recording Industry Association of America in April 2013. The song has been covered numerous times, including charting versions by Nathan Carter in 2012 and Darius Rucker in 2013.

Content
The song describes a hitchhiking journey south along the eastern coast of the United States from New England in the northeast through Roanoke, Virginia, with the intended destination of Raleigh, North Carolina, where the narrator hopes to see his lover. As the narrator is walking south of Roanoke, he meets a trucker who is traveling from Philadelphia through Virginia westward toward the Cumberland Gap and Johnson City, Tennessee.

Old Crow Medicine Show's version of the song is in swing 2/4 time signature, with an approximate tempo of 76 half notes per minute. It uses the I–V–vi–IV pattern in the key of A major, with the main chord pattern of A–E–Fm–D.

Background and writing

"Wagon Wheel" is composed of two different parts. The chorus and melody for the song comes from a demo recorded by Bob Dylan during the Pat Garrett and Billy the Kid sessions in February 1973. Although never officially released, the Dylan song was released on a bootleg recording, usually named after the chorus and its refrain, "Rock Me Mama". Dylan left the song an unfinished sketch.

Ketch Secor of Old Crow Medicine Show wrote verses for the song around Dylan's original chorus and melody:

So rock me mama like a wagon wheel
Rock me mama any way you feel
Hey mama rock me
Rock me mama like the wind and the rain
Rock me mama like a south-bound train
Hey mama rock me

Chris "Critter" Fuqua, Secor's school friend and future bandmate, first brought home a Bob Dylan bootleg from a family trip to London containing the rough outtake called "Rock Me, Mama". Not "so much a song as a sketch, crudely recorded featuring most prominently a stomping boot, the candy-coated chorus and a mumbled verse that was hard to make out", the tune kept going through Secor's mind.

A few months later, while attending Phillips Exeter Academy in New Hampshire and "feeling homesick for the South," he added verses about "hitchhiking his way home full of romantic notions put in his head by the Beat poets and, most of all, Dylan." Secor's verses tell "the story of a man who travels from New England, through Philadelphia, and Roanoke, down the eastern coast of the United States, ending up in Raleigh, North Carolina, where he hopes to see his lover."

The Secor lyrics contain a geographic impossibility: the trucker is said to be heading "west from the Cumberland Gap" to Johnson City, Tennessee, but Johnson City is actually east of the Cumberland Gap. As Secor explains, "I got some geography wrong, but I still sing it that way. I just wanted the word 'west' in there. 'West' has got more power than 'east.'"

Creative rights
Secor saw the Dylan contribution as "an outtake of something he had mumbled out on one of those tapes. I sang it all around the country from about 17 to 26, before I ever even thought, 'Oh, I better look into this.'" When Secor sought copyright on the song in 2003 to release it on O.C.M.S. in (2004), he discovered Dylan credited the phrase "Rock me, mama" to bluesman Arthur "Big Boy" Crudup, who recorded a song with this title in 1944. He likely got it from a Big Bill Broonzy recording "Rockin' Chair Blues" from 1940 using the phrase "rock me, baby". The phrase "like a wagon wheel" is used in the 1939 Curtis Jones song "Roll Me Mama" that includes the lines "Now roll me over, just like I'm a wagon wheel" and "just like I ain't got no bone". He re-recorded it in 1963 as "Roll Me Over", with some of the lyrics. In the meantime, Lil' Son Jackson came up with "Rockin' and Rollin" in 1950 using the phrase "Roll me, baby, like you roll a wagon wheel". As Secor says: "In a way, it's taken something like 85 years to get completed." Secor and Dylan signed a co-writing agreement, and share copyright on the song; agreeing to a "50-50 split in authorship." When Secor discovered the famous singer-songwriter was willing to publish the song with Old Crow, he, like earlier claimed originators, disavowed authorship:

Secor recalls that "I met (Dylan's son) Jakob, and Jakob said it made sense that I was a teenager when I did that because no one in their 30s would have the guts to try to write a Bob Dylan song."

Popularity

As Old Crow Medicine Show's signature song, "Wagon Wheel" is in some ways bigger than the group itself—even though the song's origins predate formation of the musical act. The song has become extremely popular since its inclusion on Old Crow Medicine Show's major label debut, O.C.M.S. in 2004; it was released as its lead single two weeks prior to the album's release, although the song also appeared in an earlier form on the now out-of-print EP Troubles Up and Down the Road in 2001. The group reportedly performed the song at the Station Inn in Nashville in 2001, as part of a series of songs commemorating Bob Dylan's 60th birthday.

This "catchy country-infused sing-along" has "taken on the status of 'Free Bird'"—"in that it has become a bar room staple that drunks love to loudly request at every show, regardless of who the band is" John Cranford with music label Swampfire Records—who organize a regular jam session on Hilton Head Island, South Carolina called Swampfire Sessions—says "It has become our generation's 'Freebird.'"

The song has been performed so often live at venues and events that some actually discourage its performance. At the Swampfire Sessions, Cranford states: "We banned it. (We) literally put signs up that said 'Absolutely No Wagon Wheel.'" The New England Americana Festival sells a shirt with an image of a wagon wheel with a line through it—creating a "no 'Wagon Wheel' zone"—and "hipster bar owners 'ban' it."

"Man, some of us hate that song," Cranford said. "Others play it all the time." Often playing "Wagon Wheel" on request, he quit doing so after Rucker's cover. "This song was great when Dylan wrote it and Old Crow played it, but once Darius Rucker flooded the airwaves with his version, all hope was lost," Cranford said.

The group's version of the song was certified platinum by the Recording Industry Association of America in April 2013. To celebrate they released a limited edition 7" vinyl record of the song with "All Night Long (Live)" on the B-side. Secor himself enjoys its popularity, saying in mid-2008, "I don't mind playing it every night. I like to see what it does to people, and it's nice to have something that's guaranteed, especially when you're shuffling through new material." Of its popularity he says:

Music video 
Old Crow Medicine Show released a music video for "Wagon Wheel" to YouTube on September 7, 2006. It features the band serving as the musical accompaniment to a burlesque sideshow at a traveling carnival. The video features cameo appearances by Gillian Welch and David Rawlings, who appear as ticket takers for the show. Rawlings also produced and played guitar on the track.

As of January 2023, the video has over 73 million views on YouTube.

Certification

Nathan Carter version

The English-Irish singer Nathan Carter covered the song in a release June 15, 2012, a few weeks before the song was covered by Darius Rucker in the United States. The Carter version was the title track taken from his 2012 album, Wagon Wheel. The album was a commercial success, hitting the Top Three in the Irish Album Chart. Carter won the RTÉ Irish Country Music Awards for Live Act of the Year in 2013 and his version won the award of Ireland's All-Time Favourite Country Song. He appeared with a live version of the song on the popular The Late Late Show on RTÉ, being his first appearance on the show. In March 2014, he released a live edition on his second live album. The album peaked at number one on the Irish Albums Chart. He also toured in Ireland, Northern Ireland, England and Scotland to promote the album.

Although released independently on Sharpe Music, the song became a huge hit for Carter and was his first hit song in England and on the Irish Singles Chart. The single spent 47 weeks on the chart in its initial release. It was the biggest commercial success of any Country and Irish release in 2012 and considered a crossover hit in the mainstream pop charts. It is the most successful version in the UK and Ireland with its re-entry in the charts later in 2013, it has totaled 52 weeks in the Irish Singles Chart (as of December 5, 2013).

Track listing
Various versions are available through iTunes including:
"Wagon Wheel" – Nathan Carter – single – (4:12)
"Wagon Wheel" (radio dance mix) – Nathan Carter and Micky Modelle – (3:46)
"Wagon Wheel" (club mix) – Nathan Carter and Micky Modelle – (3:23)

Music video
Carter released a music video of the song which features an outing on the beach where Carter sings the song with his band to his friends on the beach with those present joining in clapping and dancing. The video was filmed on Rossnowlagh beach in County Donegal, Ireland.

Darius Rucker version

Darius Rucker recorded a country version of the song with backing vocals from Lady Antebellum as the second single on his third solo project, True Believers, released on Capitol Records. He joined Old Crow Medicine Show at the Grand Ole Opry July 6, 2012, "for a special rendition of 'Wagon Wheel'" where the fans "went crazy over Rucker's cover of the Old Crow Medicine Show hit." After this reception he tweeted out: "Secret out after @opry perf. I recorded a version of 'Wagon Wheel' for my new record and @ladyantebellum sings on track."

Backstory
The song did not at first appeal to Rucker. "Somebody had played 'Wagon Wheel' for me years ago," he said. "It was one of those things that I didn't really get." The faculty band at his daughter's high school performing had a different effect, as he relates,

With guidance from Frank Liddell, Rucker cut the song with Lady A on backing vocals. He told Taste of Country: "Lady Antebellum took the song to a new level. Up until they added their vocals, I thought it was another song on the record."

Rucker had been introduced to Fuqua's source for Dylan's outtake years prior: "I got turned onto the Pat Garrett soundtrack when I worked retail back in the day. It's so different from a lot of his other stuff. It's such a cool record." Rucker also previously had had some experience with crediting Dylan on a song he'd performed. His group Hootie and the Blowfish's 1995 hit single "Only Wanna Be With You" quotes an entire verse from Dylan's 1975 song "Idiot Wind". When the record began selling big, the "Dylan camp" took issue, and Dylan was ultimately credited as a co-writer. As Rucker remembers, "They wanted some money, and they got it. We weren't trying to rip anybody off."

Genre
For Rucker it was largely an issue of musical genre and the high school group changing his thinking on it: "I knew the song, and to me it was such a perfect bluegrass tune that I didn't think I could do it. But they did a country version of it, with drums and pedal steel. I was like, 'Wait a minute. That would be a great country song.'" On deciding to go country with it, Rucker says:

When asked if he thought his recording would be nominated for a Grammy Award, Rucker responded: "If 'Wagon Wheel' doesn't get nominated for a GRAMMY, country music is screwed. It's as simple as that. I'm not saying I should win it, but it should be nominated."

Critical reception
Matt Bjorke of Roughstock gave Rucker's version a five-star rating. Billy Dukes of Taste of Country gave Rucker's version four and a half stars out of five. As to the reaction of the originating group, Rucker says, "I think the Old Crow Medicine Show guys are very happy about it, and that's all that matters to me." On Rucker's version of the song, Chris 'Critter' Fuqua of Old Crow Medicine Show says:
 Rucker's version was nominated as Single of the Year for the 47th Country Music Association Awards along with Florida Georgia Line ("Cruise"), Tim McGraw with Taylor Swift and Keith Urban ("Highway Don't Care"), Miranda Lambert ("Mama's Broken Heart") and Kacey Musgraves ("Merry Go 'Round"). Rucker closed the televised awards show with the song November 6, 2013. 

Rucker won the Grammy Award for Best Country Solo Performance at the 56th Annual Grammy Awards (held January 26, 2014) for his version of "Wagon Wheel". Rucker's win makes him only the second solo African American after Charley Pride to be both nominated for and win a vocal performance Grammy award in a country music category. Other nominees up for the same award were Lee Brice for "I Drive Your Truck", Hunter Hayes for "I Want Crazy", Miranda Lambert for "Mama's Broken Heart" and Blake Shelton for "Mine Would Be You".

In August 2016 Taste of Country placed the Rucker version of "Wagon Wheel" 17th on its list of "Top Country Songs of the Century".

Music video
Rucker released a music video of the song on March 21, 2013, which features Si, Jase, Sadie, Korie and Willie Robertson of the television show Duck Dynasty, along with Charles Kelley of Lady A.  It was filmed in Watertown, Tennessee.

Chart performance
The most popular song of his career, solo or otherwise, Rucker's "Wagon Wheel" debuted at No. 51 on the U.S. Billboard Country Airplay chart for the week of January 19, 2013. It also debuted at number 32 on the U.S. Billboard Hot Country Songs chart for the week of January 26, 2013. It debuted at No. 96 on the U.S. Billboard Hot 100 chart for the week of February 6, 2013; it debuted at 72 on the Canadian Hot 100 chart for the week of February 13, 2013. In its 10th chart week, March 20, 2013, Rucker's version made "a strong move" on Hot Country Songs, going from 11 to 5, and to 18 on Country Airplay (to 14.7 million, up 20%). Old Crow's original (from 2004) sold 15,000 and ranked 28 on Country Digital Songs the same week. The song reached number one on Hot Country Songs in its 12th week. It is his most successful song as a solo artist on the Billboard Hot 100, peaking at No. 15, as well as the Canadian Hot 100, where it peaked at number 23. By March 2014, the song has sold 2,678,000 copies in the United States, making it then the fifth best-selling song by a male country solo artist.  As of October 2019, the song has sold 3,776,000 copies in the US. On October 27, 2022, the song became eleven times platinum. The song became the fourth country song to be certified diamond on October 29, 2022.

Charts and certifications

Weekly charts

Year-end charts

Certifications

In popular culture
South Dakota Democratic U.S. Senate candidate Rick Weiland sang a parody of the song "with lyrics rewritten to match his campaign message" at a campaign "folk-rock concert" at the Strawbale Winery north of Sioux Falls in October 2014. Parody lyrics included the line: "I can't run a nine million-dollar campaign, but I don't have EB-5 to explain". Senator and 2016 Democratic vice presidential candidate Tim Kaine played the song on harmonica with local act Nikki Talley and Jason Sharp at the Catawba Brewing Company in Asheville, North Carolina on August 15, 2016.

In 2019, as part of the release of Ken Burns' miniseries Country Music, Bank of America released a video of the song, featuring six musicians from across the United States, with the tag line "Nothing connects the country like country." Each musician sang one line for the first six lines of the song.

References

2004 songs
2012 singles
2013 singles
2000s ballads
Bob Dylan songs
Capitol Records Nashville singles
Darius Rucker songs
Old Crow Medicine Show songs
Song recordings produced by Frank Rogers (record producer)
Songs written by Bob Dylan